Tai Ngau Wu Teng is a mountain in the southeastern part of Lantau Island, Hong Kong, with a height of  above sea level.

Geology 

Tai Wu Ngau Teng  is formed by Granitic rocks, unlike many of the tallest mountains on Lantau Island, such as Lantau Peak, which are formed by Volcanic rocks.

See also 
 List of mountains, peaks and hills in Hong Kong
 Mui Wo

References